Central Line was an R&B and soul band from London, England. They recorded two albums with Mercury in the 1980s and had two hit singles in the United States, as well as one Top 40 hit in their native country.

Career
The band was formed in March 1978, and were signed to Mercury Records early in 1979 by John Stainze. The original founding members were Steve Salvari, Camelle Hinds, Lipson Francis and Henry Defoe. Hinds, Francis and Defoe were previously in a band called TFB (Typical Funk Band), which had contained members that would go on to form Light of the World. TFB also contained the drummer Errol Kennedy, who later joined Imagination. Salvari joined TFB after the departure of Kenny Wellington in late 1976, as their second keyboard player and the band members then stood at Salvari, Hinds, Francis, Defoe and Kennedy. The band gigged for about a year then broke up. Francis and Defoe went to work with a bass player who was in Boney M., and Salvari and Hinds staying together to work on various projects. 

In early 1978, four of the TFB members got back together, and expanded the previous format by recruiting
Linton Beckles (born Linton Charles Beckles, 17 December 1955 – 3 April 2015) and Kim "Jake" Le Mesurier (younger son of English actors John Le Mesurier and Hattie Jacques and brother of longtime Rod Stewart guitarist Robin Le Mesurier). The band decided they needed a new identity, and Defoe came up with the name Central Line, because the band were now running down a central line of funk and soul.

They toured with Roy Ayers, Grover Washington, Fat Larry's Band and the Real Thing. Central Line released their first single, "Wot We Got Its Hot" to a good reception, but their second single "Sticks & Stones" did not fare so well. They finished the year appearing on BBC Television's, Linda Lewis' Roadshow.

Salvari left in early 1980. After working with Barry White, Robert Palmer and Sheena Easton, he continues in the music industry as a record producer. Mel Gaynor left after their debut album was released to join Simple Minds, and soon after Henri Defoe enjoyed a writing collaboration with Michael Finbarr Murphy.

Bassist Hinds later formed Hindsight with Defoe, and also played bass in the Style Council, as well as forming the Walkers with trumpet player Canute Wellington, and releasing "(Whatever Happened to) the Party Groove" / "Sky's the Limit" in 1983. 

Despite a club hit with "Walking into Sunshine" which sold well in the United States, and a UK Top 40 hit with "Nature Boy", consistent mainstream success eluded them, and they disbanded in August 1984.

Le Mesurier died in Spain in the 1990s from an accidental drug overdose.

Beckles died in London from complications of pneumonia on 3 April 2015. He was 59. His son is footballer Omar Beckles of Leyton Orient.

Lipson Francis died on 29 June 2018.

Original members
Steve Salvari –  Vocals, keyboards
Camelle Hinds – Vocals, bass
Lipson Francis – Vocals, keyboards
Henri Defoe – Vocals, guitar
Jake Le Mesurier – Drums, percussion
Linton Beckles – Vocals, percussion
Mel Gaynor – Drums, percussion 
Michael Finbarr Murphy – Guitars, keyboards
Roy Carter – Keyboards, guitar
Steve Jeffries – Keyboards
George Chandler – Backup vocals
Dee Sealy – Backup vocals
Jimmy Chambers – Backup vocals

Discography

Albums

Singles

References

External links

Central Line at Musicglue
Central Line at Webstarts
Central Line at Facebook

English boogie musicians
English dance music groups
English pop music groups
British post-disco music groups
British soul musical groups
English funk musical groups